Horsfieldia punctatifolia is a species of plant in the family Myristicaceae. It is a tree that grows naturally in Sumatra, Peninsular Malaysia, Singapore and Borneo.

References

punctatifolia
Trees of Sumatra
Trees of Malaya
Trees of Borneo
Least concern plants
Taxonomy articles created by Polbot
Taxa named by James Sinclair (botanist)